The Arkansas–Louisiana–Texas League was a Negro league baseball league that operated for one season in 1951. The league fielded 9 teams in Arkansas, Louisiana and Texas.

List of teams (in alphabetical order)
Atlanta Globetrotters, Atlanta, Arkansas (1951)
Camden Bombers, Camden, Arkansas (1951)
El Dorado Blue Sox, El Dorado, Arkansas (1951)
Gurdon Panthers, Gurdon, Arkansas (1951)
Hope Regulars, Hope, Arkansas (1951)
Magnolia, Magnolia, Arkansas (1951)
Nashville Elite Giants, Nashville, Arkansas (1951)
Shreveport Travelers, Shreveport, Louisiana (1951)
Texarkana Giants, Texarkana, Arkansas and Texarkana, Texas (1951)

References

External links
Center for Negro League Research

Defunct minor baseball leagues in the United States
Negro baseball leagues
Baseball leagues in Arkansas
Baseball leagues in Louisiana
Baseball leagues in Texas
Sports leagues established in 1951
1951 establishments in the United States
1951 disestablishments in the United States
Sports leagues disestablished in 1951